Figure skating at the 1948 Winter Olympics took place at the Olympic Ice Rink in St. Moritz, Switzerland. Three figure skating events were contested: men's singles, ladies' singles, and pair skating.

Event summary
Barbara Ann Scott became the first Canadian to win the figure skating gold medal while Dick Button became the first American to win a figure skating title for the United States. Button also became the first figure skater to perform a double Axel in competition. The pair of Micheline Lannoy and Pierre Baugniet became the first Belgians to win the figure skating gold medal, as well as the first Belgians to win a gold medal at the Winter Olympics.

The competition began with the men's compulsory figures on 2 February. However, the next day, competition was postponed in the midst of the ladies' figures event due to a thaw that left puddles of water on the outdoor ice surface. On 5 February competition had to be resumed, regardless of poor ice conditions, in order to allow the Games to finish on schedule. The pairs event on 7 February was skated in a heavy snowstorm, with the ice having to be scraped after each program.

Medal summary

Medalists

Medal table

References

External links
  
 Winter Olympic Memories: Men
 Winter Olympic Memories: Ladies
 Winter Olympic Memories: Pairs
 Skatabase: Men
 Skatabase: Ladies
 Skatabase: Pairs

 
1948 Winter Olympics events
1948
1948 in figure skating
International figure skating competitions hosted by Switzerland